Easy TV Home was a ISDB-T encrypted digital terrestrial television product and service operated by Solar Digital Media Holdings, Inc., a subsidiary of Solar Entertainment Corporation. Originally as a mobile TV dongle service, it later distributed digital set-top boxes, as well as freemium digital TV channels. Until its discontinuation on September 30, 2019, due to poor sales, Easy TV was receivable in selected areas in Metro Manila and parts of nearby provinces.

Channel lineup

All channels provided by Solar (with the exception of ETC and Shop TV, which are free-to-air on all digital platforms) were encrypted and scrambled using ABV encryption system, thus required activation via hotline or through their website for those channels to be unscrambled. In addition, all non-encrypted digital terrestrial TV channels broadcast within the area of the household are also carried.

A recent notice on the website states that only free-to-air channels can be viewed on set-top boxes after September 30, 2019, with EasyTV ceasing commercial operations due to low sales and stiff competition from rival ABS-CBN TV Plus.

See also
 ABS-CBN TV Plus
 GMA Affordabox
 Sulit TV

References

External links
 Official website (archived)

Solar Entertainment Corporation
Digital television in the Philippines
Products introduced in 2018
Products and services discontinued in 2019
2018 establishments in the Philippines
2019 disestablishments in the Philippines